The Cut River may refer to one of the following rivers:

Cut River (Mackinac County, Michigan), a river in the Upper Peninsula of Michigan
Cut River Bridge, carries U.S. Route 2 over the Cut River
Cut River (Roscommon County, Michigan), a river in the Lower Peninsula of Michigan
Cuț River, a tributary of the Tazlăul Sărat in Romania